Acalolepta sericeiceps is a species of beetle in the family Cerambycidae. It was described by Kriesche in 1936, originally under the genus Dihammus. It is known from Papua New Guinea.

References

Acalolepta
Beetles described in 1936